Jean Malo-Renault (9 June 1900 in Paris – 9 August 1988 in Rennes) was a French librarian. Malo-Renault was born in Paris on 9 June 1900 into a family originating from Saint-Malo. He was the son of the pastellist, engraver and illustrator, Émile Malo-Renault, real name Émile Auguste Renault, and his wife Honorine Césarine Tian (Nori Malo-Renault), herself a printmaker, etching in color.

Jean Malo-Renault obtained his degree in history from the Sorbonne in 1924, and went on to the École du Louvre, where he wrote a thesis on religious architecture in Brittany in the Middle Ages.

Career 
In 1928, he was appointed medical science subject librarian at the University of Toulouse; in 1932, he became librarian at the University of Montpellier. For a complementary thesis, he studying the letter adorned in the Middle Ages.  Going on to be chief librarian of the public library of Montpellier in 1935. He returned to Brittany in 1937, and was in charge of Rennes University and Municipal Libraries until 1954.

Jean Malo-Renault collected a copious iconographic documentation towards a thesis on the religious architecture of Brittany. More broadly he was interested in Breton costume and popular arts.

He is known as the author of a vast retrospective bibliography of Brittany for which he analysed printed sources and periodicals from the period 1480 to 1960, which is preserved (150 000 handwritten records) in the Bibliothèque de Rennes Méropole and available on microfiche since 1988.

In addition to the retrospective Bibliography of Brittany, he publishes Les pseudonymes des bretons (16th - 20th centuries) in 1987.

He died at Rennes on 9 August 1988, aged 88.

Publications 

 «La sculpture romane en Bretagne  » ,'Thèse de l’École du Louvre. Mars 1926
 «Les Sculpteurs Romans des Saint-Benoit-sur--Loire», La Revue de l'art ancien et moderne, avril 1927,  p. 209-222
 «Les Sculpteurs Romans des Saint-Benoit-sur--Loire», La Revue de l'art ancien et moderne, mai 1927, p. 315-322
 La chapelle de Notre-Dame de Tréminou, Bulletin d'Histoire d'Archéologie de Quimper, 1927
 La sculpture gothique en Bretagne : les calvaires », Revue de l'art, no 319, septembre-octobre 1930, p. 109-130. Notre-Dame de Tronoën, Chapelle (Finistère).
 Au Musée de Toulouse,La porte des Apôtres de Saint-Étienne , Bulletin des Musées de France; juin1929
 Musée des Augustins de Toulouse. La porte de la Daurade, Bulletin des Musées de France, avril 1930
 « L'art du livre », Bookstorest Garnier frères, Paris, 1931
 « Les monuments français en péril en Bretagne », Bulletin de l'Art, supplement of the Revue de l'Art, January 1932, p. 26  to 28.
 «Un Chansonnier  de L’École de Jean Pucelle». Manuscrit à Montpellier, Les trésors des bibliothèques de France. T. IV, 1933.
 La lettre ornée du Moyen Âge, 1934. According to the manuscripts of Montpellier
 Le Malouin Jean Le Cudennec, roi de Madagascar, typed plate, 1948, 5 p.
 Bibliographie rétrospective de la Bretagne 1480-1960, 1987.
 Notice sur la Bibliographie Rétrospective de la Bretagne, 1972.
 « L'église de Fouesnant »  periodical, Fouesnant, no 4, 1974, p. 11 to 17,
 « La sculpture gothique en Bretagne : les calvaires », Revue de l'art, no 319,  September–October 1930, p. 109 to130. Notre-Dame de Tronoën, Chapel (Finistère).
 « Notes sur trois cathédrales bretonnes » Notebook n° 103 - 26 ème année n° 3, Cahiers de l'Iroise, 1979, p. 141 to 145.
 Les Pseudonymes des Bretons, XVIe – XXe siècles, 2 volumes, reissue. 1987-1988,
« Max Jacob par Max Jacob », Cahiers de l'Iroise,no 4, reprinted (tiré-à-part), October–December 1987.

Annex

References 

1900 births
1988 deaths
French bibliographers
French librarians
History of Brittany